Marshall Brunskill Booker (November 26, 1880 – July 8, 1940) was an American Democratic politician who served as a member of the Virginia Senate. Prior to this, he served one term in the Virginia House of Delegates before being elected clerk of the Senate in 1908. He resigned this position in 1912 to become Commonwealth's Attorney for Halifax County. he died at age 59 in Hailfax Virginia

References

External links

1880 births
1940 deaths
Democratic Party Virginia state senators
20th-century American politicians
People from Gloucester County, Virginia
Democratic Party members of the Virginia House of Delegates
People from Halifax County, Virginia
County and city Commonwealth's Attorneys in Virginia